, whose alias is , is the main protagonist of the Sunrise anime series Code Geass: Lelouch of the Rebellion. In the series, Lelouch is a former prince from the superpower Britannia who is given the power of the "Geass" by a witch known as C.C. Using the Geass and his genius-level intellect, Lelouch becomes the leader of the resistance movement known as The Black Knights under his alter ego  to destroy the Holy Britannian Empire, an imperial monarchy that has been conquering various countries under control from his father. 

Besides Code Geass, Lelouch has appeared in multiple related adaptations and spin-offs, such as Nightmare of Nunually, as a superpowered human, Akito the Exiled as a brainwashed strategist, and Code Geass: Lelouch of the Re;surrection (2019) leading his forces as an alternate sequel to the original television series. He is also present in the Super Robot Wars crossover video games which depict alternate scenarios to his role in the Code Geass series too.

Lelouch was designed by the group of manga artists Clamp, who aimed to create a stylish and visually appealing character. Director Gorō Taniguchi handled the character alongside writer Ichirō Ōkouchi and agreed the film Code Geass: Lelouch of the Re;surrection as his final appearance in the franchise. He is voiced by Jun Fukuyama and his younger self is voiced by Sayaka Ohara. In the English dub he is voiced by Johnny Yong Bosch and Michelle Ruff young.

The character of Lelouch has been recognized as one of Japan's most popular characters during the time Code Geass aired, appearing at the top of several polls. Publications for anime and manga saw Lelouch as an interesting character. His voice actors Fukuyama and Bosch have been praised for their work as Lelouch's voice.

Creation and design

While designing the concept art for Lelouch, the series' original character designers, Clamp, had initially conceived of his hair color as being white. Nanase Ohkawa, head writer at Clamp, said she had visualized him as being a character to which "everyone" could relate as being "cool", literally, a "beauty". While developing the character during the initial planning stages, the series' core staff at Sunrise, director Gorō Taniguchi, writer Ichirō Ōkouchi, and the production team discussed numerous possible influences for the character with Clamp, such as the Japanese idol duos KinKi Kids and Tackey & Tsubasa. The prototype of Lelouch is Rokuro Makube, the antagonist in Osamu Tezuka’s manga The Vampires. Taniguchi wanted Lelouch's actions in the television series to leave a major impact in the cast, later resulting in the creation of the movie to explore it furthermore. 

When designing the character, Taniguchi asked Clamp to give him a strong aura; He originally did not want Lelouch to open up to his friends which is why he shows a coldhearted personality when first seen, most notably when interacting with his high school friends. Taniguchi asked designers Takahiro Kimura, Yuriko Chiba and Kazuya Murata help when animating the character, most notably whenever Lelouch moves his hands and does poses while talking. In the making of the film trilogy, Taniguchi was asked to change events from the relationship Lelouch and C.C. have.

During the early planning stages for Lelouch's alter ego, "Zero", Clamp had wanted to create a mask never witnessed prior in any Sunrise series. Zero was one of the earliest developed characters. Ōkouchi wanted a mask to be included as a part of the series, because he felt that a mask was necessary for it to be a Sunrise show. In early designs of the character, Zero possessed long silver nails. Tanaguchi claimed that Lelouch's original view in the eyes of the fans changed from his anime persona to a more like manga one. The staff thus wanted Lelouch's characterization to be more realistic. In 2019, during the promotion of the upcoming movie, Taniguchi said that he wanted to leave Lelouch's death to be ambiguous, but later rescinded that statement by explaining that the TV series was not written with the idea of "Lelouch is alive" in mind.

For the 10th anniversary of the series, Taniguchi decided it was necessary to do further development with Lelouch which led to the newest film. While the staff believe the franchise will be expanded in following years, they no longer plan to use Lelouch's character. The resurrection of the dead main character gave the staff difficulties especially because of his popularity. Since the end of the anime the show staff have officially confirmed on multiple occasions that Lelouch is truly dead and not immortal because Lelouch paying for his sins through death was their sense of ethics. 
One such example was the "Geass Memories" anniversary twitter event where screenwriter and co-creator Ōkouchi said: "At the very least, he should be aware of his sins and atone for them with death. That was the ethical viewpoint of me and director Taniguchi's work."

Casting

Japanese voice actor Jun Fukuyama said he had no problems in voicing Lelouch for the Lelouch of the Resurrection film in contrast to the television series, finding his character simpler to understand as rather than end the war, Lelouch participated in the film solely to protect his sister. Fukuyama claimed that Lelouch was one of the most successful works in his entire career to the point many people called his work as a masterpiece. As a result, following the ending of the television series, Fukuyama started receiving offers in regards to doing other anime series. He also remarks he had fun working alongside Suzaku's actor, Takahiro Sakurai, whom he looked after due to his experience. Taniguchi recalls Fukuyama having troubles redoing the young Lelouch in the films released after the television series. Taniguchi stated that Fukuyama's work was outstanding based on his role in the movie being ten years older than in first episode. In retrospective, Fukuyama stated he was shocked he had to voice Lelouch again in the movie trilogy.

Johnny Yong Bosch voices the character in the English dub of the series. He expressed joy over how the original series ended. As a result, Bosch had mixed feelings in regards to voice a dead character again during the film's early production. He thought it was just a rumor at first. He regarded him as not "exactly the same Lelouch" when comparing the television series and the movie. When explaining the movie, Bosch felt that Lelouch's return appeared to be understandable but he was still "torned" by the decision to revive the protagonist. In the end, he accepted the idea of reusing the late character. He compared the idea of Lelouch's resurrection with Western movies' twists provided in their endings. He believed this could lead to more Code Geass series in the future.

Appearances

In Code Geass

Lelouch of the Rebellion
Lelouch is introduced in the first episode of the series as a student of Ashford Academy. His true identity is that of Lelouch vi Britannia, son of the Emperor of Britannia, Charles zi Britannia, and the late Imperial Consort Marianne. Following his mother's assassination, an event which also left his sister blind and crippled, father banished him and his sister Nunnally to Japan, where they were used as political tools. It was during his stay at the Kururugi household that he first met Suzaku Kururugi, who would later become his best friend. He accidentally boards a truck used by Japanese resistance operatives. Within the truck is a capsule holding a witch known as C.C., who sacrifices herself to save him from the military forces trying to recapture her. When it seems as if her sacrifice was pointless, C.C. offers him the "Power of the King", the mythical power of Geass. The Geass manifests itself in him as the power of absolute obedience, which allows him to make people obey his orders without question. With his new power, Lelouch begins his rebellion against the Britannian Empire, starting by killing his half-brother, Clovis la Britannia, after extracting information about the murder of his mother. He takes up the identity of Zero and later forms the Order of the Black Knights, becoming a revolutionary and gaining popular support amongst the people.

The turning point in his rebellion comes when his half-sister, Euphemia li Britannia, declares the region under Mount Fuji the Special Administrative Zone of Japan, giving the Japanese people their name and country back. Lelouch confronts her at the opening ceremony. However, at this moment his Geass permanently activates without him knowing, and an offhand comment about ordering her to kill the Japanese causes Euphemia to do just that. Lelouch reluctantly kills her and uses the massacre as an excuse to spark the Black Rebellion, in which he declares Japan to be an independent nation and leads an attack on the Tokyo Settlement. The attack goes well at first, but when Lelouch learns that Nunnally has been kidnapped, he abandons the battle, leaving his forces helpless against the better-organized Britannian military. Lelouch makes his way to Kamine Island to search for Nunnally, but is confronted by Suzaku. The second season reveals that Lelouch is defeated by Suzaku, who arrests his former friend and brings him to his father.

Lelouch of the Rebellion R2
A year after the Black Rebellion, after the Emperor wiped out his memories, Lelouch is living as an Ashford student with Rolo Lamperouge assigned to oversee the delusion under the guise of Lelouch's younger brother. Lelouch's memories are restored by C.C., and he resumes leadership of the Black Knights, gaining Rolo's trust in the process. When Nunnally is appointed as Governor of Area 11 and announces her plans to reestablish the Special Administrative Zone of Japan, Lelouch engineers the legal exile of the Black Knights by getting the Britannians to agree to exile Zero in exchange for bringing one million participants for Nunnally's new Japan. The Black Knights escape to the Chinese Federation, where Lelouch begins forging an alliance with the other world powers to create a force that rivals Britannia. He starts by destabilizing the Chinese Federation, returning control to Empress Tianzi from the High Eunuchs. Once Lelouch's new alliance, the United Federation of Nations, is formed, their first act is to liberate Japan. Despite Lelouch's desire to protect his sister, the geass he placed on Suzaku back on R1 to "live" causes him to shoot a FLEJA, a nuke-like weapon, when he is about to die from several of Lelouch's lieutenants, destroying a large portion of the Tokyo Settlement and presumably killing Nunnally. Schneizel then convinces the Black Knights to betray him with a despondent Lelouch willing to be killed by his former comrades, until Rolo sacrifices his life to save him. 

Joined by Suzaku, Lelouch learns the truth that his mother faked her death and has been aiding the Emperor in their goal to wipe out individuality from the world. Lelouch,  rejects the reality his parents intend, controls the will of the C's World entity itself to erase the Sword of Akasha and his parents out of existence. One month later, Lelouch usurps the Britannian throne and appoints Suzaku as his knight to set the stage for their ultimate plan, the Zero Requiem. As Emperor, Lelouch dismantles the Britannian class system and frees every colony. He then requests that Britannia join the U.F.N, but proceeds to take the council members hostage after it is revealed that Britannia's large population would give him a majority voting block. This brings him into conflict with Schneizel, who has Nunnally in his custody and commands the Damocles (a floating fortress which he intends to place into a position which would allow him to fire nuclear weapons worldwide), and the Black Knights now under Kaname Oghi. In the final battle, as Suzaku fakes his death, Lelouch uses his Geass to control Schneizel and his sister. With Schenizel and the Damocles both under his control, Lelouch declares himself the ruler of the world. Two months later, the Zero Requiem's final phase takes place with Lelouch being killed by Suzaku in the guise of Zero. With his death, Nunnally succeeds her brother as Empress and the world unites in a new era of peace and cooperation.

Code Geass: Akito the Exiled
Taking place between the first two seasons, Suzaku brings Lelouch to Charles, he offers to hand him over on the condition he be inducted into the Knights of the Round. Charles agrees, and uses his Geass to alter Lelouch's mind. With this, Lelouch becomes the empire's Evil Military Adviser, Julius Kingsley. Lelouch makes a few appearances in the miniseries, first seen in Suzaku's custody as he clutches his right eye while begging his friend for water, only to Upon arriving in St. Petersburg, Kingsley proudly declares that the Emperor has placed him in charge of all the Eastern front operational planning for Britannia's military. Kingsley encounters Shin Hyuga Shaing and others for a meeting. Lelouch showcases a clip to create fear and havoc within the city. Later on, he plays chess along with Hyuga, but starts hallucinating Kingsley and past memories from Rebellion. Later on, Hyuga figures out that he was both Zero and Lelouch and calls his squad. Suzaku, in an attempt to defend the secret, kills most of the squad. Eventually, both are captured, with Hyuga later declaring Kingsley executed and revealing that he is Zero.

From here, Kingsley begins to regain his memories in a traumatized fashion, prompting Suzaku to strangle him, until Lelouch begins to cry and beg Suzaku to kill him. They are saved by Rolo Lamperouge, and from there Charles is forced to use his Geass on Lelouch again. This time, he is unaware of his royal heritage or being Zero, but still lives a life strikingly similar to the one he led at the start of the series.

Code Geass: Lelouch of the Re;surrection
In the events of the 2019 film Code Geass: Lelouch of the Re;surrection, which takes place a year after the events of the recap movies which form a non-canon alternate universe, Lelouch's corpse is revealed to have been smuggled away by Shirley and literally resurrected from the dead by C.C. But C.C. reveals that Lelouch lost his memories because his soul is sealed within C's World. Eventually, C.C. manages to finally fully resurrect Lelouch when she helps Kallen, Sayoko, and Lloyd free Suzaku after he and Nunnally were kidnapped by the Zilkhistans who need the latter to restore their country to its former glory. Lelouch momentarily resumes his identity as Zero to rescue Nunnally, bequeaths his alter ego to Suzaku before traveling the world with C.C. under the alias "L.L."  which according to director Taniguchi was Lelouch's idea of a marriage proposal.

Other media

In Code Geass: Lost Colors, the video game for the PlayStation 2 and PlayStation Portable, there are several different endings and clips of Lelouch that involve the main character, Rai who joins the same school. Across the game, the player can make Rai befriend Lelouch. Rai can also become Lelouch's best friend as well as Zero's partner. In the video game Another Century's Episode: R, Lelouch makes an appearance in his Knightmare Frame, the Shinkirō. He also appears in the spin-off with his Shinkiro. Lelouch and the rest of the Code Geass R1 cast make their debut to the Super Robot Wars franchise in this game, using their R1 Knightmares.

The Code Geass manga follows the same basic plot as the anime, but with several differences. Knightmares do not exist.  As for Lelouch's character, he is still the same as he was in the anime. He takes on the identity Zero, but largely focuses on his activities with the Black Knights. Nightmare of Nunnally features Lelouch's transformation into Zero by merging with C.C. This time the Geass grants Lelouch supernatural strength allowing him to battle the Knightmares in hand-to-hand combat. After several fights against Britannia, Zero orders the Black Knights to side with the army to defeat the Emperor as Euphemia is due to take over the empire. Once the Emperor is defeated, Zero's death is announced, as Lelouch inherits C.C.'s name and immortality, becoming C.C. The Demon King and goes forth to spread Geass and to promote conflict around the world.

In the manga Suzaku of the Counterattack, Lelouch obtains his Geass in the same way as in the anime series, except that his Geass symbol is slightly rendered. Many of the Black Knights are not loyal to Zero and often split off into renegade factions or act without his knowledge. Lelouch is held responsible for a terrorist attack when a Black Knights faction had gone renegade without following his instructions. He later goes to kill his father only to discover that he was already killed by Schneizel, his half-brother; however, it is later revealed to be Schneizel's scheme to get Lelouch executed and to take C.C.'s Code. Near the end of the manga, Lelouch tries to use his Geass on Schneizel, but the latter punctures his left eye, leaving him never to use his Geass again.

In Tales of an Alternate Shogunate, set in 1853 at the Bakumatsu Era, Lelouch is the commander of the military counterinsurgency brigade known as the Shinsengumi, formed under the orders of the Shogunate to fight the rebel group known as the Black Revolutionaries, but was secretly the leader of that group as Zero and has gained information from within. The event is set in Kyoto, and Lelouch had recently acquired his geass from C.C. and had stolen Britannian's new Knightmare, Gawain.

In a special Code Geass Picture Drama episode, Lelouch appears on December 5 for Ashford Academy's school festival, helping Rivalz, now school president, along with some of his friends. However a battle erupts in school grounds by the Neo-Chinese Federation, led by a former eunuch, who takes everyone hostage. With help of his friends, Lelouch manages to stop the Federation soldiers. In the aftermath, the entire episode is revealed to be a dream which the ghost of Lelouch used to thank everyone. In a special OVA parody episode, based on the Alice in Wonderland story, Lelouch is narrating the story and appears in the role as the Mad Hatter.

Reception

Popularity
Lelouch's character has been well received by viewers of the series, appearing in various anime polls. Lelouch was voted the most popular male character of 2006, 2007, and 2008 in Animage magazine's annual Anime Grand Prix and Newtype magazine named him the best anime male character of the decade. In the Society for the Promotion of Japanese Animation Awards from 2008, Lelouch was nominated as one of the best male characters. In 2014, NTT customers voted him as their 13th favorite black haired male anime character. His voice actor Jun Fukuyama also won the "Best Actor in a Leading Role" award for his portrayal of the character at the first Seiyu Awards in 2007. Fukuyama's work as Lelouch's voice actor also lead him to win the Tokyo International Anime Fair in the category "Best Voice Actor".

In June 2020, Tokyo gubernatorial candidate Teruki Gotō cosplayed as Lelouch during his election campaign. In a poster, it said "I, Teruki Gotō, command you: Vote for me." in the same manner as the character. Sunrise stated they were not related to Gotō who removed his poster and apologized to in response.

Critical
Critics for anime and manga series have also commented on Lelouch's character. Anime News Network's Carl Kimlinger stated that Lelouch "is hard to like" because of his narcissistic personality, but noted that his bonds with Nunnally and his friends make up for that. Bamboo Dong from the site agreed with Kimlinger, though noted that Lelouch' made the series interesting to watch. Gia Manry from the same site listed Suzaku and him as the third-best "frenemies" in anime due to how their friendship falls apart as a result of their rivalry. Mostly positive responses were given by Danielle Van Gorder from Mania Entertainment due to Lelouch's differences from most of anime's protagonists and how his double life as 'Zero' and as a student is shown across the series. Chris Beveridge from the same site praised Lelouch's actions in R2 when he becomes Britannia's Emperor, describing him as "the classic angle of the villain with good motives" because of the dangerous actions he does for a greater good. Beveridge also commented on his confrontations with Scheizel and Nunnally, mentioning the rivalry across the series in the former and citing the latter as heartbreaking. Johnny Yong Bosch's work was also the subject of praise.

IGN compared him with Light Yagami from the Death Note series, due to his double life and his questionable methods, respectively. The double life aspect has also been praised due to how such change also differentiates the show's tone from a high school comedy to an action show, and how he "winds-up" between his two selves. Moreover, his reasons for evil actions have also been found to help viewers to like the character. Also from IGN, Ramsey Isler found Lelouch's double life trait as rather comical as after short prologue of his role as Zero in an episode, he is seen doing homework at school for being absent to classes. Kevin Leathers from UK Anime Network enjoyed Lelouch's personality as his cold persona made the series "refreshing" from other mecha anime. Lelouch is ranked 23rd on IGN's 2009 list of best anime characters of all time, and 18th on IGN's 2014 list. The Fandom Post noted that Suzaku and Lelouch's relationship might attract female viewers so he recommended an anthology manga to them, praising the multiple designs presented. Kotaku enjoyed both Lelouch's and Suzaku's traits due to how both of them consider themselves evil, resulting in the series achieving an appealing ending due to how the duo orchestrate Lelouch's death in order to bring peace to the chaos they created.

In the book CLAMP in Context: A Critical Study of the Manga and Anime, Dani Cavallaro commented that the viewers had both positive and negative reactions in regards to Lelouch's actions through his Geass which allows him to toy with humans. Cavallaro claims that despite his actions, Lelouch still show a sense of vulnerability in the television series especially when his mistakes originate from doubts he has when dealing with people close to him. As resulting, the writer states that Lelouch deviates from being a typical terrorist due to he often showing weakness when committing crimes. Otakuzine regarded him as one of the most intelligent anime characters due to his achievements in the battlefield, which the magazine compared with his skills at chess.

In regards to his role in Lelouch of the Re;surrection, Anime News Network noted that while the film centers around the multiple consequences of Lelouch's actions across the television series in regards to the returning cast, he was not the main character, as instead, the narrative focused more on C.C. Nevertheless, the writer noted that one of the biggest mysteries behind the film that people wondered was if Lelouch revived something that might have ruined the television series' ending. The Fandom Post commented that when reviving, with it being the thing he was looking forward the most, Lelouch retains his old traits such as his love interests and his bond with Suzaku. However, he still found his ending with C.C too abrupt despite feeling appropriate at the same time. On the other hand, Kotaku criticized his role in the OVAs Akito the Exiled due to their lack of relevance.

References

Code Geass characters
Fictional activists
Fictional murdered people
Television characters introduced in 2006
Fictional commanders
Fictional dictators
Fictional emperors and empresses
Fictional gamblers
Fictional hypnotists and indoctrinators
Fictional revolutionaries
Fictional characters with post-traumatic stress disorder
Fictional mass murderers
Fictional princes
Fictional vigilantes
Fictional regicides
Fictional fratricides
Fictional patricides
Fictional matricides
Fictional sororicides
Fictional suicides
Fictional terrorists
Male characters in anime and manga
Teenage characters in anime and manga
Fictional high school students